Colin Kazim-Richards (born 26 August 1986), also known as Colin Kâzım, Kâzım or Kâzım Kâzım, is a professional footballer as a forward for Süper Lig club Fatih Karagümrük S.K. 

Born and raised in England, he qualified for Turkish nationality through his mother's heritage. An anglicised form of the Turkish given name Kâzım was intended to be a middle name, which would have rendered his full name as Colin Kazim Richards, but due to an error, he was legally registered as Colin Kazim-Richards.

Having played as a junior for Queens Park Rangers and Arsenal, Kazim-Richards was handed a professional contract by Bury. He noted Bury as a pinpoint of his career. He found playing under former Manchester United player Chris Casper influential to his development. He also went on to feature in the Football League for Brighton & Hove Albion before transferring to Premier League side Sheffield United where he remained for one season. He has since forged a career in Europe with Fenerbahçe, Toulouse, Galatasaray and Olympiacos. In 2007, he chose to represent Turkey at international level, retiring in 2015. Kazim-Richards earned 37 caps, scoring twice.

Club career

Bury
Kazim-Richards left his native East London to play for Bury when he was 15.

Brighton & Hove Albion
In June 2005, at the age of 18, he was signed on a three-year contract by Brighton & Hove Albion for £250,000. The contract was signed after a fan of the club, Aaron Berry, won the sum for the club in a competition run by Coca-Cola which, in turn, led to Kazim-Richards being dubbed the "Coca-Cola Kid". In August 2006, at the start of the new season, he tried to hand in a transfer request after being dropped by manager Mark McGhee.

Sheffield United
Subsequently, Brighton sold him to Sheffield United for £150,000 on 31 August 2006, the deadline day for the transfer window. Kazim-Richards signed a three-year deal with the Blades after passing a medical and agreeing personal terms. He scored once for the eventually relegated Blades, in a 2–2 draw with Bolton Wanderers on 11 November 2006.

Fenerbahçe

On 15 June 2007, Kazim-Richards signed a four-year contract with the Turkish club Fenerbahçe. He scored his second UEFA Champions League goal for Fenerbahçe in the quarter-final first leg against Chelsea on 2 April 2008. After serving as a rotation player during the 2007–08 and 2008–09 seasons, Kazim-Richards broke into Christoph Daum's first choice line-up in the 2009–10 season.

Despite success on the pitch during the 2009–10 season, Kazim-Richards had an argument with Fenerbahçe fans after being taken off the pitch in a match against İstanbul Başakşehir. Against Beşiktaş, Kazim-Richards was red carded for swearing at the referee and banned for four matches. While serving his ban, on the same night that his teammates lost to Kasımpaşa, the media reported Kazim-Richards was out on the town. This report was denied by the Fenerbahçe board who released an official statement. The following day, pictures of Kazim-Richards were released and the Fenerbahçe board rescinded their earlier statement, claiming that Kazim-Richards had lied about his whereabouts which had triggered their denial of the report.

Toulouse (loan)
Kazim-Richards joined French club Toulouse on a six-month loan from January 2010, for whom he scored on his debut in a 3–1 away win against Le Mans.

Galatasaray
He returned to Fenerbahçe for the following season. On 3 January 2011, Fenerbahçe terminated his contract. He signed a three-and-a-half-year contract with local rivals Galatasaray in January 2011 scoring against Fenerbahçe during the season. In July 2012 he went on trial with English Premier League side West Ham United, appearing in pre-season friendlies. He played a total of thirty one matches scoring five goals.

Blackburn Rovers (loan)

On 10 August 2012 it was confirmed by the official Blackburn Rovers website that the striker had joined the club on a one-year loan deal with the view to a permanent transfer after spending the majority of pre season on trial with the Lancashire club. He scored two goals on his debut in pre season against Cork City. On 18 August he scored on his competitive debut in a 1–1 away draw against Ipswich Town.

On 24 May 2013 it was announced that Sussex Police had charged Kazim-Richards under Section 5 of the Public Order Act over an alleged homophobic gesture to Brighton fans on 12 February 2013 while he was playing for Blackburn Rovers in a Championship match at his old club Brighton & Hove Albion's Falmer Stadium. He was due to appear before magistrates in Brighton on 22 August 2013. The trial was set for 14 and 15 January 2014 at Brighton Magistrates Court. He was found guilty in April 2014 and fined £750 plus costs of £1,445. Richards has since stated that he has no regrets over his actions.

Bursaspor
On 4 September 2013, Kazim-Richards joined Bursaspor for €250,000. He signed a four-year deal on a salary of €1 million per year. Kazim-Richards scored his first official goal for Bursaspor in a Turkish Cup game against Adana Demirspor.

Feyenoord
After a successful loan spell at Feyenoord during the 2014–15 season, Kazim-Richards made a permanent move to the Dutch club in the summer of 2015.

On 15 January 2016, Kazim-Richards threatened Dutch Algemeen Dagblad newspaper journalist Mikos Gouka. As a result, Feyenoord manager Giovanni van Bronckhorst dropped him from the squad and he did not play the next match, against PSV.

Celtic
On 1 February 2016, Kazim-Richards joined Scottish club Celtic, signing a two-and-a-half-year deal. He scored his first goal for the club in a Scottish Cup tie against East Kilbride on 7 February 2016.

Coritiba
On 9 June 2016, Kazim-Richards joined Brazilian club Coritiba, signing an eighteen-month deal. He scored on his debut in a derby against Atlético Paranaense after coming on as a substitute.

Corinthians
On 6 January 2017, Kazim-Richards signed with another Brazilian club, Corinthians, for a period of two years. In his debut, he scored in the friendly tournament the Florida Cup.

Lobos BUAP
Kazim-Richards completed a move to Lobos BUAP of Liga MX in July 2018.

Derby County
On 15 October 2020, he signed a one-year deal with Derby County. He scored his first goal for Derby in a 1-1 draw with Coventry City on 1 December 2020. On 26 February 2021 it was reported that Kazim-Richards had signed a contract extension to keep him at the club until the end of the 2022 season.

Following relegation in the 2021–22 season, Kazim-Richards departed the club upon the expiration of his contract.

Fatih Karagümrük
On 19 July 2022, he signed a one-year deal with Fatih Karagümrük S.K.

International career
Kazim-Richards scored and was credited with an assist in his debut for the Turkey under-21 team in a victory against Switzerland on 24 March 2007. On 30 April, the Turkish national coach Fatih Terim declared that Kazim-Richards would play for the senior team.

Terim called him up for matches against Bosnia and Herzegovina and Brazil. He received his first senior international cap in a 0–0 friendly draw against Brazil on 5 June 2007, a game in which he played 38 minutes. He was a member of Turkey's Euro 2008 squad, playing in all five matches as the side reached the semi-finals.

On 10 August 2011, he scored two goals in a friendly match against Estonia at Türk Telekom Stadium.

Personal life
Born in London, Kazim-Richards attended Greenleaf Primary School in Walthamstow, where he developed an interest in football, which continued into his secondary education at Aveling Park, Walthamstow. His mother is a Turkish Cypriot (which enabled him to join the Turkish national team), and his father is of Antiguan descent.

In a 2008 interview he said:

In his youth, Kazim-Richards lost his infant brother to Edwards syndrome and three cousins in unrelated incidents: a heart attack while playing football, a brain haemorrhage in the bathtub, and a car crash. Another of his cousins, Andros Townsend, became a professional footballer.

Career statistics

Club

International

Scores and results list Turkey's goal tally first, score column indicates score after each Kazim-Richards goal.

Honours
Source:

Fenerbahçe
Turkish Super Cup: 2007, 2009

Olympiacos
Super League Greece: 2011–12

Galatasaray
Turkish Super Cup: 2013

Celtic
Scottish Premiership: 2015–16

Corinthians
Campeonato Brasileiro Série A: 2017
Campeonato Paulista: 2017, 2018

References

External links

1986 births
Living people
Citizens of Turkey through descent
Turkish people of Cypriot descent
Turkish people of Antigua and Barbuda descent
English people of Turkish descent
English people of Turkish Cypriot descent
English sportspeople of Antigua and Barbuda descent
Black British sportsmen
Footballers from Leytonstone
Footballers from Walthamstow
Sportspeople of Turkish Cypriot descent
English footballers
Turkish footballers
Association football forwards
Bury F.C. players
Brighton & Hove Albion F.C. players
Sheffield United F.C. players
Fenerbahçe S.K. footballers
Toulouse FC players
Galatasaray S.K. footballers
Olympiacos F.C. players
Blackburn Rovers F.C. players
Bursaspor footballers
Feyenoord players
Celtic F.C. players
Coritiba Foot Ball Club players
Sport Club Corinthians Paulista players
Lobos BUAP footballers
C.D. Veracruz footballers
C.F. Pachuca players
Derby County F.C. players
Fatih Karagümrük S.K. footballers
English Football League players
Premier League players
Süper Lig players
Ligue 1 players
Super League Greece players
Eredivisie players
Scottish Professional Football League players
Campeonato Brasileiro Série A players
Liga MX players
Turkey under-21 international footballers
Turkey B international footballers
Turkey international footballers
UEFA Euro 2008 players
English expatriate footballers
English expatriate sportspeople in France
English expatriate sportspeople in the Netherlands
English expatriate sportspeople in Greece
English expatriate sportspeople in Brazil
English expatriate sportspeople in Mexico
Turkish expatriate footballers
Turkish expatriate sportspeople in France
Turkish expatriate sportspeople in the Netherlands
Turkish expatriate sportspeople in Greece
Turkish expatriate sportspeople in Brazil
Turkish expatriate sportspeople in Mexico
Expatriate footballers in France
Expatriate footballers in the Netherlands
Expatriate footballers in Greece
Expatriate footballers in Brazil
Expatriate footballers in Mexico